Derrick Tribbett (born December 18, 1984), better known by his stage names Tripp Lee and Sinister, is an American musician and songwriter who is the lead vocalist of heavy metal band Twisted Method. He is the younger brother of Audiotopsy and Mudvayne lead guitarist Greg Tribbett. He is also known for his role on the reality show Daisy of Love starring former Rock of Love 2 contestant Daisy De La Hoya.

Career
Tribbett was a member of the band Twisted Method until it disbanded in 2005 and formed the band Makeshift-Romeo shortly after. He was the bassist and backing vocalist for the band Dope.

Media appearances
Tribbett was a contestant on the VH1 show Daisy of Love. He went under the alias "Sinister" on the show. He was eliminated on the July 12, 2009 episode, the tenth episode in the twelve episode series (not counting the clip show). He placed fourth overall.

Tribbett would have been a contestant on the third season of the VH1 show I Love Money which takes contestants from other VH1 shows such as Flavor of Love, Rock of Love, I Love New York, Real Chance of Love, Daisy of Love and Megan Wants a Millionaire, and to be aired in January 2010. However, the show was canceled before airing because of Ryan Jenkins' involvement in the murder of his wife and suicide.

Personal life
Tribbett is the younger brother of Greg Tribbett, the lead guitarist and backing vocalist of heavy metal bands Audiotopsy and Mudvayne and former member of Hellyeah. One of his other brothers Matt Tribbett was a drum technician for the American metal band Slipknot.

References 

Dope (band) members
1984 births
Living people
People from Cape Coral, Florida
American heavy metal bass guitarists
American heavy metal singers
Alternative metal bass guitarists
American industrial musicians
Nu metal singers
American male bass guitarists
21st-century American male singers
21st-century American singers
21st-century American bass guitarists